The Smoot–Rowlett family is a U.S. political family.  It is linked by marriage to the Kimball–Snow–Woolley family.

Family members

Daniel Rowlett
c.1786 - 2 Dec 1847
Texas Republic House of Representatives, 1837–38, 1839–40, 1843–44
Namesake of Rowlett, Texas
Brother of Joseph Rowlett 
Uncle of Abraham Owen Smoot

Joseph Rowlett
Kentucky State House of Representatives, 1838–50
Brother of Daniel Rowlett
Uncle of Abraham Owen Smoot

Abraham Owen Smoot

February 17, 1815 - March 6, 1895
Mayor of Salt Lake City, Utah, 1857–66
Mayor of Provo, Utah, 1868–81
First Head of the board of trustees of Brigham Young Academy
Stake president in Provo
Major benefactor of Brigham Young Academy, later Brigham Young University
Nephew of Daniel Rowlett
Nephew of Joseph Rowlett
Uncle of Emma Smith, who married Wilford Woodruff
Father of Abraham Owen Smoot
Father of Reed Smoot
Father of Zina Beal Smoot, who married Orson Ferguson Whitney
Grandfather of Abraham Owen Smoot III
Grandfather of Isaac Albert Smoot

Abraham Owen Smoot
March 11, 1856 - May 22, 1911
Member of Utah State Senate 
Son of Abraham Owen Smoot (1815-1895)
Half-brother of Reed Smoot
Father of Abraham Owen Smoot III
Father of Isaac Albert Smoot

Reed Smoot

January 10, 1862 - February 9, 1941
U.S. Senator from Utah, 1903–33 
Delegate to Republican National Convention from Utah, 1908, 1912, 1920, 1924, 1928, 1932 
Member of Republican National Committee from Utah, 1912–20 
Son of Abraham Owen Smoot (1815-1895)
Half-brother of Abraham Owen Smoot (1856-1911)
Half-uncle of Abraham Owen Smoot III
Half-uncle of Isaac Albert Smoot

Abraham Owen Smoot III
September 9, 1879 - 1937
Mayor of Provo, Utah, 1934–35
Grandson of Abraham Owen Smoot (1815-1895)
Son of Abraham Owen Smoot (1856-1911)
Half-nephew of Reed Smoot
Brother of Isaac Albert Smoot

Isaac Albert Smoot
Born: November 3, 1880. 
Member of Utah State House of Representatives, 1928–32
Grandson of Abraham Owen Smoot (1815-1895)
Son of Abraham Owen Smoot (1856-1911)
Half-nephew of Reed Smoot
Brother of Abraham Owen Smoot III

Wilford Woodruff

1 Mar 1807 - 2 Sep 1898 
Utah Territorial Legislature 1854
Father of Newton Woodruff
He married Emma Smith, niece of Abraham Owen Smoot (1815-1895)
Fourth President of the Church of Jesus Christ of Latter-day Saints 1889-1898

Newton Woodruff
3 Nov 1863 - 21 Jan 1960 
Mayor of Smithville, Utah 1900
Son of Wilford Woodruff and Sarah Brown

External links
Political Graveyard: Rowlett-Smoot Family

 
Political families of the United States